Pentacladiscus is a genus of diplurans in the family Projapygidae.

Species
 Pentacladiscus manegarzoni San Martín, 1963
 Pentacladiscus schubarti San Martín, 1963

References

Diplura